Juan Pablo Pino Puello (born 30 March 1987) is a Colombian professional footballer who plays as a forward.

Club career

Monaco
On 10 February 2007, Pino played his first Ligue 1 match for Monaco against Paris Saint-Germain.

Galatasaray
On 19 July 2010, Galatasaray announced that Pino had joined the team on a three-year contract for a sum of €3 million. The 23-year-old has signed a three-year deal with his new club.

He was picked man of the match during the Istanbul derby against Fenerbahçe in Kadikoy which finished 0–0 on 24 October 2010. Pino scored his first goal against Antalyaspor on 30 October 2010 which ended in a 2–1 victory for Galatasaray. Before the 2011–12 season, the new Galatasaray manager, Fatih Terim left him in Istanbul and did not call him for a pre-season camp.

On 29 August he left on loan to for Al-Nassr for €400,000.

Return to Galatasaray
After Pino returned from his loan spell at Al Nassr, he expressed his interest to stay at Galatasaray, however Terim refused Pino's interest to stay at Galatasaray and was not included in the Austria training camp squad.

Mersin İdman Yurdu
On 20 July 2012, Pino signed for Turkish club, Mersin İdman Yurdu for a fee of €100,000 on a two-year contract. After the team's training camp in Slovenia, the club and the player mutually terminated their contract. The club cited inability to adjust to the club as the reason for the termination.

Olympiacos
On 14 September 2012, Pino was in talks with the Greek club, Olympiacos F.C. to play for the team in the 2013 season. He made his debut against Veria F.C. in a 3–0 home win, contributing two assists.

Independiente Medellín
On 29 July 2013, Pino returned to his homeland to play for the club he started his career.

Arema
On 17 April 2017, Pino joined the Indonesian club side, Arema. He signed one-year deal and will used the number 20 for the 2017 Liga 1 season.

International career
Pino is also a Colombian international having previously played for the under-20 team. He made his national team debut in 2009. Pino never represented Colombia in any World Cup Tournament.

Personal life
In 2011, while playing for Al Nasr, Pino was taken into custody by Saudi moral police after mall customers complained about his religious tattoos. Pino later apologized for his actions and was released from custody after a team delegate discussed the matter with police.

Honours

Club
Independiente Medellín
Categoría Primera A: 2004

Olympiacos
Superleague Greece: 2012–13

Colombia
Juegos Centroamericanos y del Caribe: 2006

References

External links
 
 
 
 foxnews.com

1987 births
Living people
Sportspeople from Cartagena, Colombia
Association football forwards
Association football wingers
Colombian footballers
Colombian expatriate sportspeople in Monaco
Independiente Medellín footballers
AS Monaco FC players
R. Charleroi S.C. players
Galatasaray S.K. footballers
Al Nassr FC players
Olympiacos F.C. players
SC Bastia players
Club Universitario de Deportes footballers
Arema F.C. players
PS Barito Putera players
Ligue 1 players
Belgian Pro League players
Süper Lig players
Super League Greece players
Peruvian Primera División players
Liga 1 (Indonesia) players
Colombian expatriate footballers
Expatriate footballers in Monaco
Expatriate footballers in Belgium
Expatriate footballers in Turkey
Expatriate footballers in Saudi Arabia
Expatriate footballers in Greece
Expatriate footballers in Peru
Colombian expatriate sportspeople in France
Colombia under-20 international footballers
Saudi Professional League players
Colombian expatriate sportspeople in Saudi Arabia
Colombian expatriate sportspeople in Belgium
Colombian expatriate sportspeople in Greece
Colombian expatriate sportspeople in Turkey
Colombian expatriate sportspeople in Peru
Colombian expatriate sportspeople in Indonesia
Colombia international footballers